Tener Brown (or Carolyn Tener Brown, born 1960) is an American ballet coach of New Jersey Ballet. She is a former ballet dancer of American Ballet Theatre and  actress.

Personal life and career
Brown, from Upper Montclair, New Jersey, started her dance career by training with New Jersey School of Ballet at the age of 7. In 1971, when George Tomal and Joseph Carow choreographed the first New Jersey Ballet's Nutcracker, they added fouettés and challenging pointework for Clara to match Brown's skills. Brown performed as Clara on the opening night at Paper Mill Playhouse with other stars such as Edward Villella in the role of Cavalier. In 1973, Edward Villella choreographed Shenandoah Pas de Deux for New Jersey Ballet, he selected Brown to dance with him in that duet. Brown later joined American Ballet Theatre in 1979 performing corps, soloist, and then principal roles.

After seven years with ABT, Brown shifted her career to Broadway musical, film and television. She was best known for the role of Meg Giry in Andrew Lloyd Webber's musical, The Phantom of the Opera.

Currently, Brown is a repertory coach for New Jersey Ballet and a teacher at New Jersey School of Ballet.

Acting credits
During her acting career, Brown's credits include: 
Hair
All My Children
The Sopranos
Carousel
Brigadoon
Fame-the musical as Iris Kelly
La Cage Aux Folles
The Phantom of the Opera: Ballet Chorus of the Opera-Populaire, and then Meg Giry
Fletch II
The Saint
Loving
Various PBS programs

References

American ballerinas
American Ballet Theatre dancers
American musical theatre actresses
Actresses from New Jersey
Living people
1960 births
Dancers from New Jersey
20th-century American dancers
20th-century American actresses
21st-century American actresses
People from Montclair, New Jersey